The 2018–19 Northern Kentucky Norse men's basketball team represented Northern Kentucky University (NKU) during the 2018–19 NCAA Division I men's basketball season. The Norse, led by fourth-year head coach John Brannen, played their home games at BB&T Arena in Highland Heights, Kentucky as members of the Horizon League. They finished the season 26–9, 13–5 in Horizon League play to win a share of the regular season championship with Wright State. They defeated Detroit Mercy, Oakland, and Wright State to be champions of the Horizon League tournament. They received the Horizon League's automatic-bid to the NCAA tournament where they lost in the first round to Texas Tech.

During the season, forward Drew McDonald became the school’s all-time career leader in both scoring and rebounds. He passed LaRon Moore's previous record of 859 rebounds in a December 8 loss to Eastern Kentucky, and passed Craig Sanders’ previous record of 2,007 points in a win over Green Bay in the team's final regular-season game on March 2.

Previous season
The Norse finished the 2017–18 season 22–10, 15–3 in Horizon League play to win the Horizon League regular season championship. They were upset in the quarterfinals of the Horizon League tournament by No. 8 seed Cleveland State. As a regular season league champion who failed to win their league tournament, they received an automatic bid to the National Invitation Tournament where they lost in the first round to Louisville.

Roster

Schedule and results

|-
!colspan=9 style=| Exhibition

|-bs
!colspan=9 style=| Non-conference regular season

|-
!colspan=9 style=| Horizon League regular season

|-
!colspan=9 style=|Horizon League tournament

|-
!colspan=9 style=|NCAA tournament

Source:

Awards and honors

All-American
Honorable Mention: Drew McDonald

References

Northern Kentucky Norse men's basketball seasons
Northern Kentucky
Northern Kentucky
Northern Kentucky
Northern Kentucky